The 1913 Rice Grays football team was an American football team that represented Rice University as an independent during the 1913 college football season. In its second season of intercollegiate football, the team compiled a 4–0 record and outscored opponents by a total of 81 to 14. Philip Arbuckle was the head coach for the second of eleven seasons. End George Journeay was the team captain.

Schedule

References

Rice
Rice Owls football seasons
College football undefeated seasons
Rice Grays football